Lachówka is a river of Poland, a tributary of the Stryszawka near Stryszawa.

Rivers of Poland
Rivers of Lesser Poland Voivodeship